Hon. Pakung S. Mandudadatu, also known as Sultan Omar Pax Mangudadatu of the Sultanate Royal House of Rajah Buayan, is a Filipino politician who is the provincial governor of Sultan Kudarat since 2016. He also served the same post from 1998 to 2007 and was elected Representative of the 1st district of Sultan Kudarat with Tacurong under the administration's Kabalikat ng Malayang Pilipino (Kampi) party in 2007. He ran for Mayor in Lutayan, Sultan Kudarat this 2022 with his grandson, the current Mayor of Lutayan, Prince Raden Mangudadatu Sakaluran running for Vice Mayor.

Early life and education
He was born in Buluan in the Empire Province of Cotabato (now part of Maguindanao). He is the son of Bai Ginandangan Ginabpal and Datu Buto Mangudadatu - the descendant   of Sultan Tambilawan, the Brother of Datu Ali and Datu Djimbangan of Rajah Buayan.

He attended the Buluan Elementary School until his graduation in 1964. For his secondary studies, Mangudadatu attended Tacurong Academy in Tacurong and graduated in 1964. He pursued a bachelor of science degree on criminology at the Harvardian University in Davao City and obtained his degree in 1967.

Political career

He was the 3 consecutive municipal mayor of Lutayan ended in 1998.

He run as Provincial Governor of Sultan Kudarat in 1998. During his campaign for governor, he and Rep. Angelo Montilla created the SK UNA political party. He defeated Sultan Kudarat Vice Gov. Rose Jamison for governor of the province and making history as the first Muslim governor of the Christian-dominated province. He served as provincial governor for nine years from 1998-2007 due to his tangible achievements, sound abilities, proven good governance and strong political will in the Province of Sultan Kudarat. He was then called  as the "Action Man" because he is a man of action and not a man words.

On May 14, 2007, he was elected as representative of the first district of the province over his rival Angelo Montilla. Again, he made history for being the first representative of the first district of the province; While his son, Rep. Suharto Mangudadatu, succeeded him as provincial governor.

He decided to forego re-election in the 2010 elections to make a run for the gubernatorial post of the Autonomous Region in Muslim Mindanao (ARMM) but withdrew his plans after ARMM election was reset by Congress to go with the 2013 local and national mid-term elections.

After a six-year break from politics, he was again elected as the Governor of the Christian dominated Province of Sultan Kudarat in May 2016 

In 2017, Mangudadatu was appointed the new chairperson of the Regional Peace and Order Council (RPOC) in Region XII. The appointment was issued by the Office of the President of the Republic of the Philippines.

References

Living people
Kabalikat ng Malayang Pilipino politicians
Members of the House of Representatives of the Philippines from Sultan Kudarat
Governors of Sultan Kudarat
Mayors of places in Sultan Kudarat
Filipino Muslims
Filipino datus, rajas and sultans
Filipino nobility
Independent politicians in the Philippines
Lakas–CMD politicians
People from Sultan Kudarat
Year of birth missing (living people)